"No Spare Parts" is a song by the English rock band the Rolling Stones, featured as a bonus track on the 2011 re-release of their 1978 album Some Girls. It is one of twelve previously unreleased songs that appear on the reissue, and features newly recorded vocals from Mick Jagger. The song reached number 2 on Billboards Hot Singles chart.

A music video for the song was released on 19 December 2011 and was directed by Mat Whitecross.

Personnel
Mick Jagger – vocals, electric piano, percussion
Ronnie Wood – pedal steel guitar
Keith Richards – acoustic guitar, piano, background vocals
Bill Wyman – bass guitar
Charlie Watts – drums

References

1978 songs
The Rolling Stones songs
Songs written by Jagger–Richards
Song recordings produced by Jagger–Richards
2011 singles
Universal Music Group singles
Music videos directed by Mat Whitecross